Abdolkarim Behjatpoor is an Iranian cleric and associate professor of Quranic Studies at the Research Institute for Islamic Culture and Thought. He is a recipient of the Best Research Award by the Ministry of Culture and Islamic Guidance (2010).

Works
 Is the proponent of Tahrif Murtad?
 Analytic Bibliography of Quaran and Congtemporary Culture
 Tafsir in Accordance with Wahy
 An Introduction to Principles of Cultural Change
 Quran and Us
 Thematic Tafsir of Quran

References

External links
 Behjatpoor at the IICT

Living people
Academic staff of the Research Institute for Islamic Culture and Thought
Year of birth missing (living people)